Diuris praecox, commonly known as the early doubletail, Newcastle doubletail or rough doubletail is a species of orchid which is endemic to New South Wales. It has two or three grass-like leaves and up to ten light yellow flowers with a few dark brown marks. It is threatened by urbanisation.

Description
The flowers are pale yellow with a few dark brown markings at the base of the dorsal sepal and labellum. Flowering occurs from July to early September.

Taxonomy and naming
Diuris praecox was first formally described in 1991 by David Jones from a specimen collected in the Glenrock State Conservation Area and the description was published in Australian Orchid Research. The specific epithet (praecox) is a Latin word meaning "too early ripe" or "premature" referring to the early flowering period of this orchid, especially compared to the similar Diuris abbreviata.

Distribution and habitat
The early doubletail grows in coastal and near-coastal forests between Bateau Bay and Smiths Lake, especially in the Munmorah State Conservation Area and Wyrrabalong National Park.

Conservation
Diuris praecox is listed as "vulnerable" under the Australian Government Environment Protection and Biodiversity Conservation Act 1999 and the New South Wales Biodiversity Conservation Act 2016. The main threats to the species are loss of habitat due to urbanisation, weed invasion, uncontrolled track expansion and impacts due to recreational use.

References

Orchids of New South Wales
Endemic orchids of Australia
praecox
Plants described in 1991